Bobby or Robert Watkins may refer to:

 Bobby Watkins (running back) (Robert Archbald Watkins Jr., born 1932), American football running back
 Bobby Watkins (cornerback) (Bobby Lawrence Watkins, born 1960), American football cornerback
 Bob Watkins (Robert Cecil Watkins, born 1948), American baseball pitcher
 Robert Dorsey Watkins (1900–1986), United States federal judge